Majed Ahmed Abdullah (born 11 January 1959) is a Saudi Arabian former footballer who played for Al-Nassr and the Saudi national team. Abdullah is the all-time leading goalscorer for Saudi Arabia with 72 goals in 117 games. At club level, he is the record goalscorer for Al-Nassr and is the all-time top scorer of the Saudi Professional League. He was often referred to by his nickname "Arabian Jewel".

Majed Abdullah is regarded as one of the greatest Western Asian strikers of all time. He was nominated for IFFHS Asia's Player of the Century, finishing third place. He spent his entire club career at Al-Nassr, and scored 189 league goals in a twenty-one-year career. During this time, Al-Nassr established themselves as one of the dominant forces in Saudi and Asian football. With Abdullah leading the attack, Al-Nassr won five League titles and four King Cup titles as well as the 1997–98 Asian Cup Winners' Cup. Abdullah also finished as the Saudi League top scorer six times throughout his career. Majed Abdullah retired from football in 1998, after Al-Nassr's Asian Cup Winners' Cup Final victory over Suwon Samsung Bluewings.

His success was not limited to the domestic stage. In 1984 Saudi Arabia qualified for their first-ever global international tournament at the Olympic Games in Los Angeles. Abdullah scored their only goal as Saudi Arabia lost all three group games. International success did come in 1984, however, in the Asian Cup in Singapore. Saudi Arabia beat China 2–0 in the final to take the title for the first time, with Abdullah scoring the second goal. Four years later in 1988, he would score twice in the tournament in Qatar as the Saudi team retained the title by beating South Korea on penalties.

Early life
Abdullah was born to an Afro-Saudi family in the Al-Baghdadia District in Jeddah. Majed is the second son of Ahmed Abdullah. Living close to a sports club alongside being the son of a football manager piqued Majed's interest in football. In the mid-1960s, Abdullah and his family moved to Riyadh where his father got a job as the manager of Al-Nassr's youth team. Abdullah enrolled in Al-Jazaeria Elementary School and he passionately watched the older kids play football. A couple of years later, Majed joined the school football team as well as the neighborhood team. He used to play as a goalkeeper. One day the team's striker was absent and Majed had to replace him. This position change proved to be successful as Majed guided his team to a 3–1 victory. Abdullah's family moved to Hotat Khaled District and the young Abdullah joined Al-Motawasta Al-Thania high school. Majed and his neighbors formed a team they called "Al-Ittifaq". They tried to participate in a tournament but their request was rejected due to their young age. They didn't give up and challenged one of Riyadh's best neighborhood teams for a place in that tournament. Al-Ittifaq surprisingly won the match 3–1 with Abdullah scoring twice. Al-Ittifaq participated in the tournament and they went on to win the championship.

Club career
Mohammed Al-Hudayan, a teammate at Al-Ittifaq, recommended Abdullah to Al-Nassr president Prince Abdulrahman Bin Saud, as did Al-Ittifaq's coach Nasseb Awad to Khaled Al-Turki and Al-Nassr coach Ljubiša Broćić. Broćić went to see Abdullah unannounced at Al-Ittifaq's training field in Al-Batha and requested that the club sign him. Abdullah officially joined Al-Nassr on 10 November 1975.

Abdullah spent 2 years playing for the youth teams before being promoted to the senior team. He made his senior debut in a friendly against Moroccan side Al-Fath in January 1977. He made his competitive debut on 20 January 1977 by coming off the bench in the league match against Al-Shabab replacing Ibrahim Al-Hamoud. Abdullah once again came off the bench in the 2–1 defeat to Al-Qadsiah on 14 March 1977 to make his second appearance for Al-Nassr. On 18 March, Abdullah made his first start as well as score his first goal for Al-Nassr, when he headed in Nasser Al-Johar's cross, in the league match against Al-Wehda. Following an injury to first-choice striker Mohammad Al-Abdeli, Abdullah was given a chance to prove himself. He repaid that trust by scoring three goals in the final three rounds of the league against Al-Shabab, Al-Ahli and derby rivals Al-Hilal. On 5 May 1977, Abdullah scored twice in the 4–0 against Hajer in the 1977 King Cup. He then scored twice against Al-Nahda in the Round of 16 and scored the opener in the 2–1 win against Al-Qadsiah in the quarter-finals. Al-Nassr were eventually eliminated in the semi-finals by Al-Hilal. He ended his first season at Al-Nassr scoring nine goals in ten appearances. Abdullah started his second season with Al-Nassr poorly, failing to score in his first three matches. On 4 November 1977, Abdullah scored a brace against Al-Nahda to score his first goals of the 1977–78 season. He then scored the only goal in a 1–0 win against Al-Qadsiah on 10 November. Abdullah scored his fourth goal of the season in a 1–0 win against Al-Ittihad. On 29 December, Abdullah was injured and forced to leave the pitch in the derby against Al-Hilal. He made his return on 12 January 1978 and scored in the 2–1 win against Al-Ettifaq. On 17 February, Abdullah scored the only goal in a 1–0 away win against Al-Nahda, his sixth of the season. On 2 March, Abdullah scored his first hattrick for Al-Nassr in the 4–0 win against Ohod. On 10 March, he scored his second hattrick in the 3–1 away win against Al-Ittihad. On 30 March, Abdullah scored twice against Al-Shate'e in the Round of 32 of the 1978 King Cup. Al-Nassr were eliminated by eventual champions Al-Ahli in the Round of 16. Majed ended the 1977–78 season scoring 14 goals in 19 appearances.

Majed Abdullah finished as the Saudi League top scorer 6 times in his career. He also won the League 4 times as well as the King Cup 4 times. Majed is the all-time top scorer of the Saudi League with 189 goals and is also Al-Nassr's all-time top scorer with 260 goals. Majed Abdullah announced his retirement on 12 April 1998 following Al-Nassr's win in the 1998 Asian Cup Winner's Cup in front of 70,000 fans in Riyadh.

International career
Majed made his senior team debut in 1978 in an unofficial friendly against Portuguese giants Benfica where he scored 2 goals. His official debut was against China on 10 December 1978. Majed represented Saudi national team in 2 Asian Cups, 5 Gulf Cups, the 1984 Olympic Games and the 1994 FIFA World Cup. He retired from the National Team shortly after the 1994 World Cup.

Career statistics

Club
Source:

International
Statistics accurate as of match played 29 June 1994

International goals

Firsts in Majed’s life

 First training camp with Al-Nasr was in London in 1976.
 First training camp with the National Team (under 17) was also in London in 1977.
 First coach with Al-Nasr was Ljubiša Broćić
 First coach with the National Team (under 17) was Jeff Faundon.
 First shirt number with Al-Nasr was 14. 
 First shirt number with the National Team was 17.
 First match with Al-Nasr was against Al-Fath from Morocco in a friendly in 15-1-1977.
 First official match with Al-Nasr was against Al-Shabab in 22-1-1977.
 First goal with Al-Nasr was against Al-Wehda in 18-3-1977.
 First international goal was against Iran under 17 in 15-8-1977.
 First goal with the Saudi Senior Team was in a friendly against Benfica in January 1978.
 First official goal with the Saudi Senior Team was against Kenya in January 1978.
 First official Globally goal with the Saudi Senior Team was against Brazil in Olympic Games Los Angeles 1984.
 First "League Top Scorer" Trophy was in 1978-1979 season.

Lasts in Majed’s life
 Last local match was against Al-Hilal in 1996-1997 season.
 Last local goal was against Al-Ittifaq in January 1997.
 Last local trophy was the Saudi Premier League 1994-1995 season.
 Last International match was against Belgium during 1994 FIFA World Cup in 29-6-1994.
 Last International goal was against Kuwait during 1994 FIFA World Cup qualifications.
 Last Globally goal with the Saudi Senior Team was against Brazil in Golden Cup Confederations in Australia 1988.
 Last goal with Al-Nasr was against Kopetdag of Turkmenistan in 11-4-1998.
 Last match with Al-Nasr was against Suwon Samsung Bluewings in the Asian Cup Winners Cup final on 13-4-1998.
 Last "League Top Scorer" Trophy was in 1988-1989 season.

Honours

Player 
Al-Nassr
 Saudi Premier League: 1979–80, 1980–81, 1988–89, 1994–95
 Saudi King Cup: 1981, 1986, 1987, 1990
 Gulf Club Champions Cup: 1996, 1997
 Asian Cup Winners' Cup: 1997–98

Saudi Arabia
 AFC Asian Cup: 1984, 1988
 Asian Games silver medal: 1986
 Arab Nations Cup runner-up: 1992

Individual
 Saudi Premier League top scorer: 1978–79, 1979–80, 1980–81, 1982–83, 1985–86, 1988–89
 Saudi King Cup top scorer: 1979, 1987, 1989, 1990
 Arabian Golden Boot: 1981, 1989
 Gulf Cup of Nations top scorer: 1982
 Asia-Oceania Soccer Handbook Player of the Year: 1984
 Pan Arab Games top scorer: 1985
 Saudi Crown Prince Cup top scorer: 1991
 Gulf Club Champions Cup top scorer: 1991, 1996
 IFFHS Asia's Player of the Century third place: 1999
 IFFHS World Player of the Century 64th place: 2000
IFFHS Asian Men's Team of All Time: 2021

Manager 
Al-Nassr
 Asian Super Cup: 1998

Retirement match

On 20 May 2008, 10 years after Abdullah's last match, a testimonial match was held between Al-Nassr and Real Madrid, who were just crowned with their 31st La Liga title. The match was held at Al-Nassr's home ground, the King Fahd International Stadium in Riyadh. Al-Nassr won the match 4–1 with 70,000 fans in attendance. The match saw players from other clubs such as Mohamed Al-Deayea, Malek Mouath and Nashat Akram represent Al-Nassr. Arjen Robben broke the deadlock at the 50th before Mouath and Akram scored in quick succession. Saud Kariri then added a third in the 61st before Mouath scored the fourth goal in the first minute of stoppage time.

Match details

See also 
 List of top international men's football goalscorers by country
 List of men's footballers with 100 or more international caps
 List of men's footballers with 50 or more international goals

References

External links

 Majed9 website A Fan's tribute to Majed Abdullah 
 Majed Abdullah – international goals at RSSSF

1959 births
Living people
Sportspeople from Jeddah
Association football forwards
Saudi Arabia international footballers
Saudi Arabian footballers
Olympic footballers of Saudi Arabia
Footballers at the 1984 Summer Olympics
Al Nassr FC players
1984 AFC Asian Cup players
1988 AFC Asian Cup players
1994 FIFA World Cup players
AFC Asian Cup-winning players
FIFA Century Club
Saudi Professional League players
Asian Games silver medalists for Saudi Arabia
Asian Games bronze medalists for Saudi Arabia
Asian Games medalists in football
Footballers at the 1978 Asian Games
Footballers at the 1982 Asian Games
Footballers at the 1986 Asian Games
Footballers at the 1990 Asian Games
Medalists at the 1982 Asian Games
Medalists at the 1986 Asian Games